Gorenja Brezovica is a village in the Municipality of Brezovica in central Slovenia. The  municipality is part of the traditional region of Inner Carniola and is now included in the Central Slovenia Statistical Region.

Geography
Gorenja Brezovica is a ribbon village in the upper part of a dry karst valley with sinkholes that rises from the small Ponikve Karst Field in Dolenja Brezovica towards Middle Hill to the south. Houses in the village are arranged along the slope of Vrh Hill, which rises to the northeast. Other wooded hills surround the village, including Lopata Hill to the southeast with Gnojevec Hill rising behind it, and Sleme Hill to the southwest with Linte Hill rising behind it. In the dry valley below the village there are field areas named Krnice, Platovi, and Velike Njive, and west of these is Štanga Hill with low-quality hay fields mowed once a year. An intermittent pond lies along the road to Rakitna. Above it, in the area known as Preval, is Napajalna Spring (now abandoned), and Podobnica Spring lies below Lopata Hill. There are several caves in the area.

Name
The name Gorenja Brezovica literally means 'upper Brezovica', distinguishing the village from neighboring Dolenja Brezovica (literally, 'lower Brezovica'). The names Brezovica, Brezje, and names like them are relatively common in Slovenia and in other Slavic countries (e.g., Březovice in the Czech Republic, Brezovica in Serbia, etc.). The Slovene names Brezovica and Brezje are derived from the common noun breza 'birch'. Like similar toponyms in Slovenia (e.g., Brezova, Brezovec, Brezovci), it originally referred to the local vegetation. In the local dialect, the village is known as Gornja Brezovica.

History
During the Second World War, Italian forces set up a post in the village during the Rog Offensive in the summer of 1942. The local people took refuge during the war in Cerk Cave on Lopata Hill and also in a smaller cave in the Rutar Commons.

References

External links

Gorenja Brezovica on Geopedia

Populated places in the Municipality of Brezovica